was a Japanese actor, voice actor and narrator. He was affiliated with 81 Produce. He died of subarachnoid hemorrhage on 24 December 2014, aged 60.

Filmography

Television animation
 Dokaben (1977) (Murata)
 Combat Mecha Xabungle (1982) (Katakam Zushin)
 Mobile Suit Zeta Gundam (1985) (Buran Blutarch)
 Jushin Liger (1989) (Doll Phantom)
 Yu Yu Hakusho (1992) (Gondawara)
 Mobile Suit Victory Gundam (1993) (Tassilo Vago)
 Ping-Pong Club (1995) (Morio Tachikawa)
 After War Gundam X (1996) (Abel Bauer)
 Cowboy Bebop (1998) (Otto)
 Baki the Grappler (2001) (Captain Strydum)
 Pokémon (2001) (Dr. Shiranui)
 Requiem from the Darkness (2003) (Denzo Kusunoki)
 Rockman EXE Axess (2003) (Shademan)
 Oh My Goddess! (2005) (Almighty)
 Rockman EXE Stream (2005) (Shademan)
 Zoids: Genesis (2005) (General Jiin)
 Night Head Genesis (2006) (Kyojiro Mikuriya)
 Rental Magica (2007) (Oswald lenn Mathers)
 Corpse Princess (2008) (Sougen Takamine)
 Shangri-La (2009) (Sergei Talsian)
 To Love Ru (2008) (Gid Lucione Deviluke)
 Canaan (2009) (President of the United States)
 Motto To Love Ru (2010) (Gid Lucione Deviluke)
 Bakuman (2011) (Torishima)
 Gosick (2011) (Baron Musgrave)
 Jormungand (2012) (Col. Yosuke Hinoki)
 Danchi Tomoo (2013) (Colonel Sports)
 DokiDoki! PreCure (2013) (Seiji Yotsuba)
 JoJo's Bizarre Adventure (2013) (Messina)

Original video animation (OVA)
 Ambassador Magma (1992) (Fumiaki Asuka)
 Tristia of the Deep-Blue Sea (2004) (Arthur Griffen)
 Mobile Suit Gundam SEED C.E. 73: Stargazer (2006) (Joaquin)

Theatrical animation
 Kaiketsu Zorori (1993) (Pantsunda)
 Mobile Suit Z Gundam: A New Translation - Heirs to the Stars (2005), (Buran Blutarch)
 Mobile Suit Z Gundam 2: A New Translation - Lovers (2005) (Buran Blutarch)
 Naruto Shippuden: the Movie (2007) (Yomi)

Video games
 Super Robot Wars Alpha (2000) (Buran Blutarch, Tassilo Wago)
 The King of Fighters 2000 (2000) (Seth)
Super Robot Wars Alpha Gaiden (2001) (Buran Blutarch)
Shenmue II (2001) (Delin Hong)
 The King of Fighters 2001 (2001) (Seth)
 The King of Fighters 2002 (2002) (Seth)
 Mobile Suit Gundam: Encounters in Space (2003) (Shin Matsunaga)
 The King of Fighters: Maximum Impact (2004) (Seth)
 The King of Fighters: Maximum Impact 2 (2006) (Seth)
 Super Robot Wars Z (2008) (Buran Blutarch, Abel Bauer)
 Super Robot Wars V (2017) (Buran Blutarch)
 The King of Fighters All Star (2020) (Seth)

Unknown date 
 Gears of War 2 (Richard Prescott) (Japanese Dub)
 Gears of War 3 (Richard Prescott) (Japanese Dub)
 Super Robot Wars series, Buran Blutarch

Tokusatsu
 Juukou B-Fighter (1995), Voice of Dangar
 B-Fighter Kabuto (1996), Voice of Zabodera
 Mahou Sentai Magiranger (2005), Voice of Samurai Shichijuurou

Drama CDs
 Ao no Kiseki series 2: Catharsis Spell, Guid

Dubbing roles

Film
Bruce Willis
 The Expendables (Mr. Church)
 Fire with Fire (Mike Cella)
 Looper (Old Joe Simmons)
 Moonrise Kingdom (Captain Duffy Sharp)
 A Good Day to Die Hard (John McClane)
Willem Dafoe
 The Life Aquatic with Steve Zissou (Klaus Daimler)
 Inside Man (Captain John Darius)
 Out of the Furnace (John Petty)
 Ali, Cassius Clay, Sr. (Giancarlo Esposito)
 Attack Force, Robinson (Andrew Bicknell)
 Bad Country, Jesse Weiland (Matt Dillon)
 Beverly Hills Cop III (1997 TV Asahi edition), Serge (Bronson Pinchot)
 The Big Lebowski (Blu-Ray edition), Jesus Quintana (John Turturro)
 Carlito's Way, Benny Blanco (John Leguizamo)
 Charlie and the Chocolate Factory (2008 NTV edition), Mr. Teavee (Adam Godley)
 Die Hard 2, Sergeant Oswald Cochrane (John Costelloe)
 Die Hard with a Vengeance, Karl
 Elizabeth, Monsieur de Foix (Eric Cantona)
 French Kiss, Bob (François Cluzet)
 Gone Baby Gone, Lionel McCready (Titus Welliver)
 I Still Know What You Did Last Summer, Mr. Brooks (Jeffrey Combs)
 Jack Ryan: Shadow Recruit, Thomas Harper (Kevin Costner)
 The Judge (Dwight Dickham (Billy Bob Thornton))
 Killing Me Softly, Senior Police Officer (Ian Hart)
 Knight and Day, Antonio Quintana (Jordi Mollà)
 Lawn Dogs, Morton Stockard (Christopher McDonald)
 The Long Kiss Goodnight, Timothy (Craig Bierko)
 Lucky Stars Go Places, Libbogen / Lib-Bogen (Billy Lau)
 The Man Who Cried, Dante Dominio (John Turturro)
 The Matrix Reloaded, The Merovingian (Lambert Wilson)
 The Matrix Revolutions, The Merovingian (Lambert Wilson), Deus Ex Machina (Kevin Michael Richardson)
 Monrak Transistor, Yot (Black Phomtong)
 The Mummy: Tomb of the Dragon Emperor, General Yang (Anthony Wong)
 The Muppets, Tex Richman (Chris Cooper)
 Music and Lyrics, Sloan Cates (Campbell Scott)
 The Rock, Lonner (Xander Berkeley)
 Source Code, Dr. Rutledge (Jeffrey Wright)

Television
 CSI: NY, Mac Taylor (Gary Sinise)
 The Dead Zone, Malcolm Janus (Martin Donovan)
 Odyssey 5, Chuck Taggart (Peter Weller)
 Under the Dome, James "Big Jim" Rennie (Dean Norris)

Animation
 A Troll in Central Park (Alan)
 American Dragon: Jake Long (The Huntsman)
 Barbie as Rapunzel (Hobie)
 Bartok the Magnificent (The Skull)
 The Batman (Killer Croc)
 Bolt (Dr. Calico)
 Cars 2 (Brent Mustangburger)
 Dragon Tales (Quetzal)
 Iron Man (MODOK)
 Justice League (Doctor Fate)
 Justice League Unlimited (Doctor Fate)
 Planes (Brent Mustangburger)
 Planes: Fire & Rescue (Brent Mustangburger)
 Superman: The Animated Series (Doctor Fate)

Other
 Tsukutte Asobo, Gorori

References

External links
81 Produce profile 

1954 births
2014 deaths
Japanese male video game actors
Japanese male voice actors
Male voice actors from Tokyo
20th-century Japanese male actors
21st-century Japanese male actors
Nakamura Hidetoshi